The 2019 Men's Roller Hockey World Cup was the 44th edition of the Roller Hockey World Cup, organised by World Skate. The tournament was held in Spain, in the city of Barcelona, as part of the 2019 World Roller Games.

Competition format
Teams qualified to the three cups by their continental tournaments. Finally, eight teams composed the World Championship (first tier) and the Intercontinental Championship (second tier), while twelve teams composed the Challenger's Championship.

Teams were divided into groups of four teams for composing the group stage. The two last qualified teams of the World Championship and the two group winners of the Intercontinental Championship faced in a playoff where the two winners played the knockout stage of the World Cup. This playoff was played between the two best group winners of the Challenger's Cup and the two last qualified teams of the Intercontinental Championship.

World Championship

Qualified teams

Source

Group stage

Group A

Group B

Knockout stage

Fifth to eight position

Intercontinental Cup

Qualified teams

Source

Group stage

Group A

Group B

Knockout stage

Fifth to eight position

Challenger Championship

Qualified teams

Source

Group stage

Group A

Group B

Classification matches
All matches were played on 13 July.

|}

Final standings

|-
| colspan="11"| Played the knockout stage
|-

|-
| colspan="11"| Played the Intercontinental Cup
|-

|-
| colspan="11"| Played the Challenger Cup
|-

|}

References

External links
World Skate website

Roller Hockey World Cup
International roller hockey competitions hosted by Spain
Sport in Barcelona
FIRS World Cup
Roller Hockey World Cup
Roller Hockey World Cup